Pajaritos is a metro station on the Line 1 of the Santiago Metro, in Santiago, Chile. Ruta 68 and General Bonilla Avenue run parallel to the station. The station was opened on 15 September 1975 as part of the inaugural section of the line between San Pablo and La Moneda.

It has a moderate flow of passengers, being placed in a residential-industrial area. The flow of passengers has grown since 2004, due to a nearby intercity bus station serving Valparaíso, Viña del Mar, Quilpué, Curacaví and the Comodoro Arturo Merino Benitez international airport.

Near the station there are the Chilean Investigations Police school, and the grounds of an old amusement park, Mundomágico, which has become the Cultural Center of Lo Prado city.

In 2009, one of the platforms was partially demolished to make way for a third track, which made necessary the partial rebuilding of the station east of its original location. The project included an additional street-level mezzanine. The central track is currently used for reversing the direction of trains.

Etymology
The name of the metro station comes from the Pajaritos avenue, placed near the station.

Destinations (intermodal bus station)

References

Santiago Metro stations
Railway stations opened in 1975
1975 establishments in Chile
Santiago Metro Line 1